Henrik Grevenor (27 May 1896 – 3 September 1937) was a Norwegian art historian.

Biography
Henrik Gustav Rønneberg Grevenor  was born in Stavanger; the son of Gustav Andreas Michaelsen and Karin Rønneberg. 
In 1916 he became an assistant at the Antiquities Collection at the University of Oslo, promoted to amanuensis in 1918. From 1917 he was also at the University's ethnographic museum.  He was  also a lecturer at the University of Oslo  on the subject of art history. From 1928 he was deputy manager at the Norwegian Museum of Decorative Arts and Design.

His thesis from 1928, Norsk malerkunst under renessanse og barokk 1550–1700, is regarded a fundamental work in the history of Norwegian art. Among his other works are Fra laugstiden i Norge from 1924, and monographies of Jean Heiberg from 1933, and of Mathias Stoltenberg from 1935.

Selected works
Fra Laugstiden i Norge (1924)
Norsk billedkunst gjennem tusen aar (1925) 
Norsk malerkunst under renessanse og barokk 1550–1700 ( 1928) 
Jean Heiberg (1933)
Mathias Stoltenberg. En kunstner mellem to tidsaldre (1935)

Personal life
He was married in 1919 to  ballet dancer and choreographer Inga Jacobi  (1891–1937).

References

1896 births
1937 deaths
People from Stavanger
Norwegian art historians
 University of Oslo alumni
Academic staff of the University of Oslo